Euphorbia cussonioides is a species of plant in the family Euphorbiaceae. It is endemic to Kenya.

References

cussonioides
Endemic flora of Kenya
Vulnerable flora of Africa
Taxonomy articles created by Polbot